Toruń Voivodeship was a unit of administrative division and local government in Poland in the years 1975–1998, superseded by the Kuyavian-Pomeranian Voivodeship. Its capital city was Toruń.

Major cities and towns (population in 1995)
 Toruń (204,300)
 Grudziądz (102,900)
 Brodnica (27,400)
 Chełmno (22,000)

See also
 Voivodeships of Poland

Former voivodeships of Poland (1975–1998)
Toruń